Andri Kirsima (born 17 April 1971, in Tallinn) is an Estonian architect.

Andri Kirsima graduated from the Department of Architecture of the Tallinn University of Art (today's Estonian Academy of Arts) in 1995.

He works in the architectural bureau Kirisma&Niineväli OÜ.

Works by Andri Kirsima include are the bus station of Rapla, Marientahl department store and office building and the Coca-Cola Plaza multiplex cinema in Tallinn. Andri Kirsima is a member of the Union of Estonian Architects.

Works
 villa in Viimsi, 1997 (with Hannes Niineväli (:et))
 bus station of Rapla, 1999
 multiplex cinema, 2001
 Apartment building on Paadi Street, 2002 (with Hannes Niineväli)
 Villa in Viimsi, 2003
 Dormitory in Tallinn, 2005
 Marienthal Center, 2008 (with Hannes Niineväli)

See also
 List of Estonian architects

References
 Union of Estonian Architects, members

1971 births
Living people
Architects from Tallinn
Estonian Academy of Arts alumni